Thomas Baden Morris (30 April 1900 – 22 January 1986) was an English writer from Godstone, Surrey who as T. B. Morris and as Yves Cabrol wrote a large number of plays, popular with amateur theatre groups.

As a prolific playwright (over a hundred one-act plays written) he has been compared with Philip Johnson (playwright) and David Campton, and has been remarked on for his stylistic breadth and variety of subject matter and cast requirements.

His "Yves Cabrol" plays are comedies set in provincial France.

Several of his plays were directed by Patricia Hackett for the University of Adelaide Theatre Guild in the 1940s: Renaissance Night,  Gild the Mask Again and The Beautiful One.

He died in Bristol in 1986.

References

External links 
 Doolee.com the playwrights' database:T. B. Morris
 Doolee.com the playwrights' database: Yves Cabrol

20th-century British dramatists and playwrights
1900 births
1986 deaths
People from Godstone